Lieutenant General Louis Earnest Woods (7 October 1895 – 20 October 1971), one of the Marine Corps' outstanding aviators, served as commanding general, aircraft, Fleet Marine Force, Atlantic, and 2nd Marine Aircraft Wing at the Marine Corps Air Station Cherry Point, North Carolina, prior to his retirement. During World War II, he commanded the Cactus Air Force at Guadalcanal during November and December, 1942, and later, at Okinawa, was commanding general, Tactical Air Force, Tenth Army, and the 2nd Marine Aircraft Wing.

For outstanding services rendered in the former named position he was awarded a Gold Star in lieu of a third Legion of Merit, and in the second capacity a Distinguished Service Medal. His citation for the latter reads in part, "…Continually exposed to terrific fire from enemy ship and shore batteries, as well as bombing and strafing attacks by hostile aircraft, Brigadier General Woods directed the operations of his forces with such daring skill and tenacious determination that a total of twenty-two Japanese surface craft was sunk and sixty-five planes destroyed.

Brigadier General Woods by his dauntless courage and outstanding leadership, contributed in a great measure to the success of our forces in that area."

LtGen Woods retired on 1 July 1951, after 34 years of Marine Corps service.

Biography
Louis Woods was born on 7 October 1895, in Fredonia, New York. He attended Syracuse University, Syracuse, New York. Woods died on October 20, 1971, in Washington, D.C.

Marine Corps service

1917 - 1940
Woods was commissioned a second lieutenant in the United States Marine Corps on 4 April 1917.

In March 1918, he transferred to the  where, except for a short period of four months, he remained until ordered ashore in October 1921.

In June 1922, after attending the Aviation School, Pensacola, Florida, he was designated a Naval Aviator. For the next two years he was stationed at Marine Air Station Quantico, Virginia, performing duties as a pilot.

He was ordered to foreign shore duty in Haiti, where in July 1924, he joined Observation Squadron Two, First Marine Brigade, at Port-au-Prince as executive officer of the squadron.

Shortly after his return to the United States in August 1926, he was ordered to Headquarters Marine Corps, Washington, D.C., for duty in the Aviation Section of the Major General Commandant's Department. Except for a one-year course of instruction at the Air Corps Tactical School, Langley Field, Virginia, he remained at Headquarters until August 1933, when he was detached to overseas duty in Haiti. There he joined the First Marine Brigade as executive officer, Observation Squadron Nine-M, at Port-au-Prince.

From August 1934 to June 1937, he was stationed at the Marine Corps Schools, Quantico, Virginia, first as a student in the Senior Course, and later as Chief of the Aviation Section of the Schools.

During the next three years he was executive officer, and then commanding officer, of the Second Marine Aircraft Group at the Naval Air Station San Diego, California. In June 1940, he became a student in the Senior Course, Naval War College, Newport, Rhode Island.

World War II

Upon graduation in May 1941, he joined the 1st Marine Aircraft Wing. He accompanied the Wing to the South Pacific in September 1942, where he participated in the Battle of Guadalcanal as the chief of staff for, then major general, Roy Geiger. He would become commander of the Cactus Air Force on November 7, 1942 and lead the men through the lowest point in the campaign until he turned the command over to Brigadier General Francis P. Mulcahy on December 26, 1942.

He returned to the United States and assumed duties as director, Division of Aviation, Headquarters, Marine Corps in June 1943, where he received a Gold Star in lieu of a second Legion of Merit.

He went to the war in the Pacific for the second time when he assumed command of the 4th Marine Aircraft Wing based in the Marshall-Gilbert Area and was commander, Shore Base Force. He was awarded the Legion of Merit for his outstanding service in this area.

In 1944, Wood also had the distinction of sending off to war a 42-year-old pilot named Charles Lindbergh. All but disgraced by his pro-German comments and behavior before World War II, the legendary but tainted Lindbergh had previously been denied returning to the Army Air Corps when he had volunteered after Pearl Harbor. Now in his role as civilian test pilot for United Aircraft, Lindbergh convinced Wood that he could properly test the company's new Vought F4U Corsair fighter planes only by flying them in actual combat conditions. Wood agreed, Lindbergh was soon cleared, and he quickly head off to the Solomon Islands. where he would fly 50 combat missions.

On June 11, 1945, he succeeded Mulcahy, who was in ill health, as commanding general of the Tactical Air Force, Tenth Army and the 2nd Marine Aircraft Wing, for which he was awarded a Gold Star in lieu of his Third Legion of Merit.

Post-war

In November 1945, he took command of the 1st Marine Aircraft Wing at Tientsin, China, and received an Oak Leaf Cluster in lieu of a fourth Legion of Merit for his meritorious performance of duty in providing air support for all Allied Forces in North China.

He returned to the United States to become commander, Marine Air, West Coast in August 1946. When that organization was deactivated in September 1947, General Woods was named commanding general of the 1st Marine Aircraft Wing, which had just returned to the United States. He was detached to Marine Corps Air Station Cherry Point, North Carolina on August 1, 1949, where he remained until his retirement in July 1951.

Decorations
Wood's decorations include:

See also

 List of 1st Marine Aircraft Wing commanders

Notes

References

Books

Web

1895 births
1971 deaths
People from Fredonia, New York
United States Naval Aviators
United States Marine Corps generals
United States Marine Corps World War II generals
United States Marine Corps personnel of World War I
Recipients of the Navy Distinguished Service Medal
Recipients of the Legion of Merit
Honorary Commanders of the Order of the British Empire
Air Corps Tactical School alumni
Burials at Arlington National Cemetery